Carlo Rolandi (2 July 1926 – 7 August 2020) was an Italian sailor. Together with Agostino Straulino he finished 4th in the Star competition at the 1960 Summer Olympics. He was born in Naples. Rolandi was the president of the Federazione Italiana Vela from 1981 to 1988.

References

External links
 
 

1926 births
2020 deaths
Italian male sailors (sport)
Olympic sailors of Italy
Sailors at the 1960 Summer Olympics – Star
Sportspeople from Naples